The canton of Morteau is an administrative division of the Doubs department, eastern France. Its borders were modified at the French canton reorganisation which came into effect in March 2015. Its seat is in Morteau.

It consists of the following communes:
 
Le Barboux
Le Bélieu
Le Bizot
Bonnétage
La Bosse
La Chenalotte
Les Combes
Les Fins
Les Fontenelles
Grand'Combe-Châteleu
Grand'Combe-des-Bois
Les Gras
Laval-le-Prieuré
Le Luhier
Le Mémont
Montbéliardot
Mont-de-Laval
Montlebon
Morteau
Narbief
Noël-Cerneux
Plaimbois-du-Miroir
Le Russey
Saint-Julien-lès-Russey
Villers-le-Lac

References

Cantons of Doubs